Interleukin-29 (IL-29) is a cytokine and it belongs to type III interferons group, also termed interferons λ (IFN-λ). IL-29 (alternative name IFNλ1) plays an important role in the immune response against pathogenes and especially against viruses by mechanisms similar to type I interferons, but targeting primarily cells of epithelial origin and hepatocytes.

IL-29 is encoded by the IFNL1 gene located on chromosome 19 in humans. It is a pseudogene in mice meaning the IL-29 protein is not produced in them.

Structure 
IL-29 is, with the rest of IFN-λ, structurally related to the IL-10 family, but its primary amino acid sequence (and also function) is more similar to type I interferons. It binds to a heterodimeric receptor composed of one subunit IFNL1R specific for IFN-λ and a second subunit IL10RB shared among the IL-10 family cytokines.

Function

Effects on immune response to pathogenes   
IL-29 exhibits antiviral effects by inducing similar signaling pathways as type I interferons. IL-29 receptor signals through JAK-STAT pathways leading to activated expression of interferon-stimulated genes and production of antiviral proteins. Further consequences of IL-29 signalization comprise the upregulated expression of MHC class I molecules, or enhanced expression of the costimulatory molecules and chemokine receptors on pDC, which are the main producers of IFN-α.

IL-29 expression is dominant in virus-infected epithelial cells of the respiratory, gastrointestinal and urogenital tracts, also in other mucosal tissues and skin. Hepatocytes infected by HCV or HBV viruses stimulate the immune response by producing IL-29 (IFN-λ in general) rather than type I interferons. It is also produced by maturing macrophages, dendritic cells or mastocytes.

It plays a role in defense against pathogens apart from viruses. It affects the function of both innate and adaptive immune system. Besides described antiviral effects, IL-29 modulates cytokine production of other cells, for example, it increases secretion of IL-6, IL-8 and IL-10 by monocytes and macrophages, enhances the responsiveness of macrophages to IFN-γ by increased expression of IFNGR1, stimulates T cell polarization towards Th1 phenotype and also B cell response to IL-29 was reported.

Antitumor immunity 
The impact of IL-29 on cancer cells is complicated depending on cancer cell type. It shows protective tumor inhibiting effects in many cases such as skin, lung, colorectal or hepatocellular cancer, but shows tumor promoting effects on multiple myeloma cells. IFN-λ have potential as cancer therapy, with effects on more restricted cell types and fewer side-effects than type I interferons.

Autoimmune diseases 
Abnormal expression of IL-29 could be involved in the pathogenesis of the autoimmune diseases by enhancing the production of inflammatory cytokines, chemokines, and other autoimmune‐related components. High levels of IL-29 in serum or disease-specific tissue was observed in patients with rheumatoid arthritis, osteoarthritis, systemic lupus erythematosus, Sjögren's syndrome, psoriasis, atopic dermatitis, Hashimoto's thyroiditis, systemic sclerosis and uveitis.

References

Further reading 

 
 
 
 
 
 
 
 
 
 
 
 
 
 
 
 
 
 
 
 

Interleukins

Cytokines
Immunology
Genes on human chromosome 19